The Society of Graphical and Allied Trades (SOGAT) was a British trade union in the printing industry.

History
SOGAT was formed in 1966 by the National Union of Printing, Bookbinding and Paper Workers and the National Society of Operative Printers and Assistants (NATSOPA). The National Union of Printing, Bookbinding and Paper Workers became the Society of Graphical and Allied Trades Division A and NATSOPA became the Society of Graphical and Allied Trades Division 1. The aim was to achieve a complete merger over time, but differences led to in-fighting and in 1970 the two divisions split, Division A retaining the name Society of Graphical and Allied Trades and Division 1 becoming the National Society of Operative Printers, Graphical and Media Personnel (but retaining the NATSOPA acronym).

In 1975, SOGAT officially became the Society of Graphical and Allied Trades 1975 (SOGAT '75) after amalgamation with the Scottish Graphical Association. In 1982, SOGAT '75 and NATSOPA finally amalgamated to become the Society of Graphical and Allied Trades 1982 (SOGAT '82). In 1991, SOGAT '82 merged with the National Graphical Association to form the Graphical, Paper and Media Union, which subsequently merged with Amicus to become that union's Graphical, Paper and Media industrial sector.

Election results
The union did not initially sponsor Parliamentary candidates, but shortly after the 1979 general election, it changed its policy.  It sponsored Bob Litherland's successful candidacy in the 1979 Manchester Central by-election, and also began sponsoring Ron Leighton, who was already a sitting Member of Parliament.

General Secretaries
1966: Tom Smith
1970: Vincent Flynn
1975: Bill Keys
1982: Bill Keys and Owen O'Brien
1985: Brenda Dean

Presidents
1966: John McKenzie
1967: Vincent Flynn
1970: Bill Keys
1975: Albert Powell
1983: Brenda Dean
1985: Danny Sergeant

References

External links
Catalogue of the SOGAT archives, held at the Modern Records Centre, University of Warwick
Catalogue of the Printing Machine Branch archives, held at the Modern Records Centre, University of Warwick

Trade unions established in 1966
Trade unions disestablished in 1991
Defunct trade unions of the United Kingdom
1966 establishments in the United Kingdom
Printing trade unions
1991 disestablishments in the United Kingdom
Trade unions based in Essex